Gentle Creatures is a 1995 album by the band Tarnation (Paula Frazer, Lincoln Allen, Michelle Cernuto and Matt Wendell Sullivan). It was released on 4AD.

Track listing

Critical reception

References

External links
4AD album page

1995 albums
Tarnation (band) albums
4AD albums